Phil Gallagher is a game designer who has worked primarily on role-playing games.

Career
Phil Gallagher worked for the UK publisher Games Workshop. Games Workshop was looking for a company interested in a license to Warhammer Fantasy Roleplay, so James Wallis of Hogshead Publishing called Gallagher and obtained the license.

His D&D design work includes When a Star Falls (1984), Blade of Vengeance (1984), Where Chaos Reigns (1985), Dark Clouds Gather (1985), and Night's Dark Terror (1986).

References

External links
 

Dungeons & Dragons game designers
Living people
Place of birth missing (living people)
Warhammer Fantasy Roleplay game designers
Year of birth missing (living people)